Madhapur is a census village in Nalbari district, Assam, India. As per the 2011 Census of India, Madhapur village has a total population of 3,100 people including 1,586 males and 1,514 females with a literacy rate of 69.19%.

References 

Villages in Nalbari district